WAGR may refer to:

 WAGR (AM), a radio station (1340 AM) licensed to Lumberton, North Carolina, United States
 WAGR-FM, a radio station (102.5 FM) licensed to Lexington, Mississippi, United States
 WAGR syndrome
 Western Australian Government Railways
 Wilms tumor 1, a protein
 The Windscale Advanced gas-cooled reactor at Sellafield
 World Amateur Golf Ranking, the R&A's global ranking system for amateur golfers